Farsi (also Romanized as Fārsī and Fāresī) is a village in Kushk-e Nar Rural District, Kushk-e Nar District, Parsian County, Hormozgan Province, Iran. At the 2006 census, its population was 211, in 42 families.

References

   

Populated places in Parsian County